Saccharomyces bayanus is a yeast of the genus Saccharomyces, and is used in winemaking and cider fermentation, and to make distilled beverages. Saccharomyces bayanus, like Saccharomyces pastorianus, is now accepted to be the result of multiple hybridisation events between three pure species, Saccharomyces uvarum, Saccharomyces cerevisiae and Saccharomyces eubayanus. Notably, most commercial yeast cultures sold as pure S. bayanus for wine making, e.g. Lalvin EC-1118 strain, have been found to contain S. cerevisiae cultures instead 

S. bayanus is used intensively in comparative genomics studies. Based on a computation-based experimental design system, Caudy et al. generated a rich resource for expression profiles for S. bayanus, which has been used in several comparative studies in yeast systems, including expression patterns  and nucleosome profiles.

See also 
Yeast in winemaking

References

External links 
Saccharomyces bayanus at ENTREZ genome project

bayanus
Yeasts
Yeasts used in brewing
Fungi described in 1895